Tribes of Neurot is an experimental music group formed by the members of Neurosis in 1995. Their music incorporates tribal sounds into ambient atmospheres.

History
Tribes of Neurot is a side project of Neurosis that consists of all the members of Neurosis along with additional musicians. The music explores many of the same themes that Neurosis does but from a radically different angle. Whereas Neurosis has structured songs, Tribes of Neurot has given them the freedom to explore practically anything in music and sound, such as 2002's Adaptation and Survival, which consists entirely of insect noises recorded and mixed to create something that sounds entirely different. Many of their releases coincide with Neurosis releases, such as Silver Blood Transmission and Neurosis' Through Silver in Blood. Tribes of Neurot's Grace epitomizes this: released alongside Neurosis' Times of Grace, the two discs are meant to be played simultaneously for an enhanced experience that neither disc delivers on its own.

Discography

Albums
Silver Blood Transmission (1995 Release Entertainment)
Static Migration (collaboration with Walking Time Bombs) (1998 Release Entertainment)
Grace (1999 Neurot Recordings)
Adaptation and Survival (2002 Neurot Recordings)
Cairn 4×CD (2002 Neurot Recordings)
A Resonant Sun CD (2002 Relapse Records)
Meridian (2005 Neurot Recordings)

EPs
Rebegin 2×7″ (1995 Alleysweeper Records)
Locust Star (1996 Relapse Records)
Rebegin CDEP (1997 Invisible Records)
God of the Center 10-inch EP (1997 Conspiracy Records)
Untitled 12-inch EP (1997 Abuse Records)
Spring Equinox 1999 CDEP (1999 Neurot Recordings)
Summer Solstice 1999 CDEP (1999 Neurot Recordings)
Autumn Equinox 1999 CDEP (1999 Neurot Recordings)
Winter Solstice 1999 CDEP (1999 Neurot Recordings)
Spring Equinox 2000 CDEP (2000 Neurot Recordings)
Summer Solstice 2000 CDEP (2000 Neurot Recordings)
Autumn Equinox 2000 CDEP (2000 Neurot Recordings)
Winter Solstice 2000 CDEP (2000 Neurot Recordings)
Spring Equinox 2001 CDEP (2001 Neurot Recordings)
Summer Solstice 2001 CDEP (2001 Neurot Recordings)
Autumn Equinox 2001 CDEP (2001 Neurot Recordings)
Winter Solstice 2001 CDEP (2001 Neurot Recordings)
split 7-inch with Earth (2007 Neurot Recordings)

Compilation/Live
60° (60 Degrees) (2000 Neurot Recordings)
Live at the Pale (2001 Neurot Recordings)

External links 
 Official ToN page

American experimental musical groups
Relapse Records artists
Musical groups established in 1995